Shakarparian (also known as Shakarparian Hills) is a hill, and a national park located near the Zero Point Interchange in Islamabad, Pakistan. Pakistan Monument and Pakistan Monument Museum are also located in Shakarparian.

The old Gakhar tribe leaders settled here before the Indo-Pak partition in 1947; later the clan was relocated to create a park for newly marked federal capital of the country in 1960–61.

Shakarparian also has a parade ground which hosts the Pakistan Day Parade every year on 23 March.

See also
 List of parks and gardens in Pakistan

References 

Parks in Pakistan
Hills of Pakistan
Tourist attractions in Islamabad
Landforms of Islamabad
Parade grounds

Amusement parks in Pakistan 
National parks of Pakistan